Chowwara railway station is a station serving Chowwara in Ernakulam district, Kerala, India. It lies between the Angamaly and Aluva stations. This station has two platforms, and passenger trains halt here.

It is in the Southern Railway zone's Thiruvananthapuram railway division (Trivandrum).

Passenger trains that halt at Chowwara include:
56361 Shoranur Jn–Ernakulam Jn Passenger (unreserved)
56370 Ernakulam–Guruvayur Passenger (unreserved)
56365 Guruvayur–Punalur Fast Passenger (unreserved)
56362 Ernakulam–Nilambur Road Passenger (unreserved)
56371 Guruvayur–Ernakulam Passenger (unreserved)
06732 Piravom Road–Angamaly Special
06733 Angamaly–Ernakulam Jn Special
66611 Palakkad Jn–Ernakulam Jn MEMU
06735 Angamali–Ernakulam Special
56375 Guruvayur–Ernakulam Passenger (unreserved)
66612 Ernakulam Jn–Palakkad Jn MEMU
06736 Ernakulam–Angamaly Special
06737 Angamaly–Piravam Road Special
56364 Ernakulam Jn–Shoranur Jn Passenger (unreserved)
56363 Nilambur Road–Ernakulam Passenger (unreserved)
56376 Ernakulam–Guruvayur Passenger (unreserved)
56366 Punalur–Guruvayur Fast Passenger (unreserved)

References

Thiruvananthapuram railway division
Railway stations in Ernakulam district
Railway stations in Kochi